Jeremy Christopher Smith is a British-born computational  molecular biophysicist.

Early life and education
Smith was educated at Earlham High School, the City of Norwich School (at which his doctoral advisor, Stephen A. Cusack, was also a pupil) and Leeds University then obtained his Ph.D. in Biophysics from the University of London.
Smith has a daughter, Serena, who was born in 1994.

Career
After his doctoral work,  Smith worked as a post-doctoral associate and lecturer at Harvard University in the group of Martin Karplus.

Smith has since built up research groups in three different countries. His first group was in Biomolecular Simulation at the Commissariat à l'énergie atomique (CEA) at Saclay, France (1989–1998). He then became the first chaired professor in computational biology in Germany, when appointed at the Interdisciplinary Center for Scientific Computing of the University of Heidelberg, Germany in 1998.

In October 2006 Smith became the first Governor's Chair at the University of Tennessee and also  Director of the UT/ORNL Center for Molecular Biophysics at Oak Ridge National Laboratory. 
His move to Tennessee arose from the presence at ORNL of world-class supercomputing capabilities,  and the Spallation Neutron Source, as the combination of neutron scattering with computer simulation has been a sustained interest of his.

In 2008, Smith was appointed Honorarprofessor (i.e., honorary professor) at the University of Heidelberg.

Smith has performed and directed research in a wide variety of fields, ranging from physics and chemistry through to practical areas such as renewable energy, environmental science and medicine. He has made advances in the high-performance computer simulation of biological macromolecules, neutron scattering in biology, the physics of proteins, enzyme catalysis, bioenergy, environmental biogeochemistry,  and early-stage drug discovery, and in the latter his group has discovered experimentally-validated lead compounds for many different protein targets and for a variety of diseases such as diabetes, prostate cancer, bacterial infections and osteoporosis. His group has also contributed to the design of vaccines against Group A Streptococcus and cancer. 
As of 2019 Smith had published well over 400 peer-reviewed scientific articles. Smith has been the supervisor of several established Biophysicists, such as Benoît Roux, Frank Noé, Jerome Baudry, Ana Bondar, amongst others.

References

External links 
 Center for Molecular Biophysics, Oak Ridge National Laboratory
 Computational Molecular Biophysics, University of Heidelberg

1959 births
Alumni of the University of Edinburgh
Alumni of the University of London
British expatriate academics in the United States
English biophysicists
Harvard University staff
Living people
People educated at the City of Norwich School
Academic staff of Heidelberg University
University of Tennessee faculty